The Brilliance BS4 is a four-door compact notchback sedan produced by Brilliance Auto in the People's Republic of China, where it is known as the Zhonghua Junjie. The car was scheduled for launch in Germany, Europe's largest national car market, in 2007.

Following poor crash test results of the BS6 model and ensuing press comments, a Western launch was postponed at the last minute, and German sales were expected to start in the autumn of 2008, when the vehicle's structure was expected to have been modified in order to achieve improved European crash test ratings. After modification, it achieved 0 stars.

The vehicle was developed in cooperation with Porsche, and used borrowed technology from BMW. A station wagon, designed by Lowie Vermeersch, was made available in 2008. Due to declining sales, the M2 and all versions was discontinued in all regions in 2014, with no current successor.

Body

Seating
The M2 can seat a total of five people. The three back passenger seats has average mid-size car leg room.

Trims
The M2 had a total of seven trims; 1.6MT, 1.6MT Deluxe, 1.8 MT, 1.8 MT Deluxe, 1.8 AT, 1.8 MT Deluxe, and 1.18 AT Premium.

The most basic trim (1.16MT) lacked aide airbags, a tire pressure gage, an anti-engine theft system, and a parking radar.

Optional Upgrades
Bluetooth and GPS was the only available option, and it was only available on the 1.8T AT Premium trim.

Engine
Initially the car was offered with an old Mitsubishi designed 1.8 L four cylinder engine claiming  of output. A diesel engine for installation in the European market version is still under development.

Transmission
The turbocharged version is available only with a four-speed automatic transmission, but for the European market base version a "sloppy" five-speed manual gear box is offered.

Ride and handling
According to Auto Express, Ride quality is "reasonably comfortable" but steering is "vague".

Equipment
The car has electronically adjustable leather seats, air conditioning and electronic parking assistance. Interior plastic is "harsh and cheap" and leather quality "cheap". ESC, which has become mainstream for European cars of this class, is not offered.

Commercial
A precise date for a European press launch of the BS4 was never announced.

The car was produced under licence by North Korean automaker Pyeonghwa as the Pyeonghwa Hwiparam II.

Sales
In the year it was launched in China, over 30,000 cars were sold. In 2013, 2414 cars were sold.

Gallery

References and further reading

External links 

https://web.archive.org/web/20120322100644/http://en.brilliance-auto.com/chanpina.aspx?id=5&typeId=1&status=1&mid=1 Brilliance M2 website - link is not working

BS4
Cars of China
Mid-size cars
Front-wheel-drive vehicles
Sedans
2010s cars
Cars introduced in 2006